Kajin may refer to:
 Kajin, Ardabil
 Kajin, West Azerbaijan